Packard Glacier is a glacier just west of Purgatory Peak in the Saint Johns Range of Victoria Land, flowing south into Victoria Valley. Mapped and named by the Victoria University of Wellington Antarctic Expedition (VUWAE), 1958–59, for Andrew Packard, summer biologist who worked in this area with the New Zealand party of the Commonwealth Trans-Antarctic Expedition in 1957–58.

Glaciers of Victoria Land
McMurdo Dry Valleys